{{Infobox nobility title
| name              = Dukedom of Westminster 
| image             =  
| image_size        =  
| alt               =  
| caption           = Quarterly: 1st and 4th, Azure a Portcullis with chains pendant Or on a Chief of the last between two united Roses of York and Lancaster a Pale charged with the Arms of King Edward the Confessor (City of Westminster); 2nd and 3rd, Azure a Garb Or (Grosvenor).
| creation_date     = 27 February 1874 
| creation          =  
| monarch           = Queen Victoria 
| peerage           = Peerage of the United Kingdom 
| baronetage        =  
| first_holder      = Hugh Grosvenor,3rd Marquess of Westminster 
| last_holder       =  
| present_holder    = Hugh Grosvenor, 7th Duke of Westminster 
| heir_apparent     = None 
| heir_presumptive  =  
| remainder_to      = the 1st Duke's heirs male of the body lawfully begotten 
| subsidiary_titles = Marquess of WestminsterEarl GrosvenorViscount BelgraveBaron GrosvenorBaronet of Eaton 
| status            =  
| extinction_date   =  
| family_seat       = Eaton Hall 
| former_seat       =  
| motto             = VIRTUS NON STEMMA  (Virtue, not ancestry)  
| footnotes         =  
}}

Duke of Westminster is a title in the Peerage of the United Kingdom. It was created by Queen Victoria in 1874 and bestowed upon Hugh Grosvenor, 3rd Marquess of Westminster. It is the most recent dukedom conferred on someone not related to the British royal family.

The 2nd, 3rd, 4th and 5th Dukes were each grandsons of the first. The present holder of the title is Hugh Grosvenor, the 7th Duke, who inherited the dukedom on 9 August 2016 on the death of his father, Gerald. The present duke is a godfather of Prince George of Wales.

The Duke of Westminster's seats are at Eaton Hall, Cheshire, and at Abbeystead House, Lancashire. The family's London town house was Grosvenor House, Park Lane, while Halkyn Castle was built as a sporting lodge for the family in the early 1800s. The traditional burial place of the Dukes is the Old Churchyard adjacent to St Mary's Church, Eccleston.

History of the Grosvenor family
Richard Grosvenor was created Baronet of Eaton in January 1622. Sir Richard Grosvenor, the 7th Baronet, was created Baron Grosvenor in 1761, and in 1784 became both Viscount Belgrave (Belgrave, Cheshire) and Earl Grosvenor under George III. The title Marquess of Westminster was bestowed upon Robert Grosvenor, the 2nd Earl Grosvenor, at the coronation of William IV in 1831.

The subsidiary titles are: Marquess of Westminster (created 1831), Earl Grosvenor (1784), Viscount Belgrave, of Belgrave in the County of Chester (1784), and Baron Grosvenor, of Eaton in the County of Chester (1761). The Dukedom and Marquessate are in the Peerage of the United Kingdom; the rest are in the Peerage of Great Britain. The courtesy title of the eldest son and heir to the Duke is Earl Grosvenor''.

Grosvenor Baronets, of Eaton (1622)
Sir Richard Grosvenor, 1st Baronet (1584–1645) was an MP
Sir Richard Grosvenor, 2nd Baronet (1604–1664), a son of the 1st Baronet
Roger Grosvenor (c. 1628–1661), a son of the 2nd Baronet, predeceased his father
Sir Thomas Grosvenor, 3rd Baronet (1656–1700), son of Roger
Sir Richard Grosvenor, 4th Baronet (1689–1732), eldest son of the 3rd Baronet, died without issue
Sir Thomas Grosvenor, 5th Baronet (1693–1733), second son of the 3rd Baronet, died unmarried
Sir Robert Grosvenor, 6th Baronet (1695–1755), third and youngest son of the 3rd Baronet
Sir Richard Grosvenor, 7th Baronet (1731–1802) (created Baron Grosvenor in 1761)

Barons Grosvenor (1761)

Earls Grosvenor (1784)

Marquesses of Westminster (1831)

Dukes of Westminster (1874)

Line of succession
There is no heir to the Dukedom of Westminster. The Earl of Wilton is heir presumptive to the Marquessate.

Family tree

See also
Earl of Wilton
Baron Ebury
Baron Stalbridge
Duchess of Westminster

References

External links

 
Mayfair
Dukedoms in the Peerage of the United Kingdom
Duke
1874 establishments in the United Kingdom
1622 establishments in England
Noble titles created in 1874
Noble titles created for UK MPs